Vera is a 1986 Brazilian drama film written and directed by Sérgio Toledo. Shot in São Paulo, it stars Ana Beatriz Nogueira, Norma Blum, Raul Cortez and Carlos Kroeber. The film is based on the life of Anderson Bigode Herzer, a transgender man most known as the author of poems book A queda para o alto (Descending Upwards).

Plot
Anderson (birth name "Vera") is a transsexual man who lives in a correctional facility for young people. After writing a book of verses about his life as a young troubled youth, he meets a benevolent, educated man, who helps him. The man even allows him to spend some time at his home, and arranges for a job for him as an intern in his office.

He comes into his gender identity and begins to dress as a man, eventually falling in love with a woman and passing as cisgender to her family.

The film succeeds in focusing on Anderson's personality and feelings until his tragic death.

Cast
 Ana Beatriz Nogueira as Vera
 Norma Blum
 Raul Cortez as Eduardo Suplicy
 Carlos Kroeber
 Adriana Abujamra
 Cida Almeida
 Liana Duval
 Abrahão Farc
 Aida Leiner
 Imara Reis

Reception
In 1986, at the Festival de Brasília it won the awards for Best Actress (Nogueira), Best Soundtrack (Arrigo Barnabé), and Best Sound (José Luiz Sasso). In 1987, Nogueira won the Silver Bear for Best Actress at the  37th Berlin International Film Festival, where Vera was nominated for Best Film. At the Three Continents Festival Nogueira received a Honourable Mention.

See also 
 Rosely Roth

References

External links
 

1986 films
1980s biographical drama films
1986 LGBT-related films
Biographical films about writers
Brazilian biographical drama films
Brazilian LGBT-related films
Films directed by Sérgio Toledo
Films shot in São Paulo
LGBT-related drama films
1980s Portuguese-language films
Films about trans men
Films scored by Arrigo Barnabé
Films based on biographies
1986 drama films